PKP class Pm36 is a class of two express passenger (P) 4-6-2 (m) steam locomotives ordered in 1936 for the Polskie Koleje Państwowe (Polish State Railways).

History

Design

The design was ready in 1936 and the following year the first two prototypes were built. One of them (Pm36-1) had aerodynamic fairing. The construction as well as the shape of it was designed by inz. Kazimierz Zembrzuski, head of the design office in the First Polish Factory of Locomotives and at the same time professor of the Warsaw University of Technology. The other (Pm36-2) had a standard look. The idea was to test both engines in parallel to compare top speed, acceleration, coal and water consumption etc. The Pm36-1 won a gold medal at the 1937
International Exposition of Art and Technology
in Paris.

Service
After the German occupation of Poland during World War II, the two locomotives were renumbered into the Deutsche Reichsbahn (DRB) fleet as 18 601 and 18 602 (class 186). The 18 601 had its streamlining removed, but was later damaged and subsequently scrapped (probably in 1942). The 18 602 survived the war, and was returned to Poland where it regained its PKP class and number. It continued to work for PKP until 1965, when it was given to the Warsaw Railway Museum.

Present day
In 1995 the machine went through a major overhaul and is now working in Wolsztyn as a tourist attraction, called Beautiful Helen (pl. Piękna Helena). It is occasionally used in regular service, pulling trains to Poznań or Leszno. Currently Beautiful Helen waits for repair in Wolsztyn.

Gallery

See also
PKP classification system

Notes

References

External links
Pm36 article at Steam locomotives site URL accessed on 5 August 2006
Photo of Pm36-1 (left). The engine on the right (Pm36-2) is currently in service at the Wolsztyn depot (Poland). Public domain.
Scan of a Polish postage stamp depicting Pm36-1. Public domain.
Public domain. Pm36-1 photo.
Public domain. Pm36-1 photo.

Railway locomotives introduced in 1937
Pm36
4-6-2 locomotives
Streamlined steam locomotives
Science and technology in Poland
Fablok locomotives
Standard gauge locomotives of Poland
2′C1′ h2 locomotives
Passenger locomotives